North Fairmount is a neighborhood in Cincinnati, Ohio. North Fairmount lies just south of the East Westwood neighborhood (thus south of the tortuous West Fork of Mill Creek), southwest of the Millvale neighborhood, and north of the South Fairmount neighborhood.

The population was 1,951 at the 2020 census.

Demographics

Source - City of Cincinnati Statistical Database. Note that in 1990/2000 English Woods was included as part of population count.

History
Fairmount began as a sprinkling of farm homes in the early 1800s. Later as the Mill Creek valley became industrialized, the creek bed was spanned and factories were located at the base of the hill. A brewery was established as early as 1825, and several more beer makers arrived in the next decades. The first newcomers were a few French and German immigrants. The community attracted Italians near the turn of the century. Fairmount developed distinct neighborhoods, I.e. North Fairmount, South Fairmount, Millvale (in northeast Fairmount), and English Woods (an early federal housing project).

References

Neighborhoods in Cincinnati